Sadiq Jaber (born 20 August 1960) is an Iraqi former football goalkeeper who played for Iraq at the 1982 Asian Games. 

Jaber played for Iraq in 1982.

References

Iraqi footballers
Iraq international footballers
Living people
Association football goalkeepers
Al-Shorta SC players
Footballers at the 1982 Asian Games
1960 births
Asian Games competitors for Iraq